Sonia Cotelle, née Slobodkine (19 June 1896 – 18 January 1945), was a Polish radiochemist.

Life and work
Sonia Cotelle was born in Warsaw, capital of the Vistula Land, in the Russian Empire on 19 June 1896. She was married, but later divorced. She graduated from the University of Paris in 1922, where she majored in chemistry. While still a student she began working in 1919 as an assistant in the Institute of Radium founded by the Nobel Laureates, Marie Curie and her husband Pierre, in the university's Faculty of Science. Cotelle was in charge of the measurement service between 1924 and 1926, after which she was appointed as a chemist in the Faculté des sciences. Cotelle was sent to the Institute of Radium in Prague, the capital of Czechoslovakia (now the Czech Republic), to set up radium standards there and conducted research at Jáchymov, where uranium ore was mined.

She became seriously ill in 1927, probably radiation poisoning after accidentally ingesting a polonium solution while pipetting it. She recovered, but the incident ruined her health. Cotelle "collaborated with Curie on studies of actinium. With Curie she redetermined the half-life of ionium using a method that minimized effects of error in atomic weights. Cotelle used electrolysis to prepare thin samples of radioactive substances for testing. This method allowed determination of polonium’s atomic number by X-ray spectroscopy." She died in 1945 from the cumulative effects of radiation poisoning.

Notes

References

1896 births
1945 deaths
University of Paris alumni
Polish chemists
Polish women chemists
Scientists from Warsaw
Victims of radiological poisoning
Polish emigrants to France